The Argentina national under-20 rugby union team, officially nicknamed Pumitas, represents Argentina at a national level. The team plays in the World Rugby Junior Championship.

Squad
Squad to the 2015 IRB Junior World Championship

Management
 Nicolas Fernandez Lobbe - Head Coach
 Galo Alvarez Quinones - Team Manager
 Ricardo Carvajal - Physiotherapist
 Carlos Cirillo - Team Doctor
 Fernando Mendonca - Trainer
 Cristian Del Castillo - Video Analyst
 Guillermo Castex - Logistics Manager
 Juan Pablo Bello - Team President

Tournament Record

References

External links
 

2008 establishments in Argentina
under20
National under-20 rugby union teams